Lu Shaye (born October 1964) is a Chinese diplomat currently serving as Chinese Ambassador to France and Monaco.

Biography
Lu was born in Nanjing, Jiangsu, in October 1964. He attended the Nanjing Foreign Language School. In 1982 he was accepted to China Foreign Affairs University. After university, he was assigned to the Ministry of Foreign Affairs. 

In 1988 he was a staff and attendant of the Embassy of the People's Republic of China in the Republic of Guinea. In 1999, he was appointed counsellor of the Africa Department of the Ministry of Foreign Affairs of the People's Republic of China, where he was promoted Deputy Director-General in 2003 and Director-General in 2009. In 2001, he served as counsellor of the Embassy of the People's Republic of China in France. In 2006 he was Chinese Ambassador to Senegal, a position he held until 2009. In July 2014, he became vice-mayor of Wuhan, capital of Hubei province. On July 22, 2015, he was appointed director of the Bureau of Policy Research, Office of the Leading Group of Foreign Affairs of the Central Committee. In February 2017, he succeeded Luo Zhaohui as Chinese Ambassador to Canada, and served until June 2019, when he was appointed Chinese Ambassador to France and Chinese Ambassador to Monaco.

Lu is proud of his reputation as a wolf-warrior diplomat, and argues that the rise of wolf-warrior diplomacy reflects the rising national strength of China and its relation to the changing international environment. 

In August 2022, after Nancy Pelosi visited Taiwan, Shaye said that the people of Taiwan had been brainwashed by pro-independence ideas, and that they needed to be "re-educated", saying "I'm sure that as long as they are re-educated, the Taiwanese public will once again become patriots".

In December 2022, Lu said of the 2022 COVID-19 protests in China that "Foreign forces came into play already on the second day."

Personal life
Lu married Wang Liwen; the couple has a son.

References

1964 births
China Foreign Affairs University alumni
Living people
People from Nanjing
Ambassadors of China to Canada
Ambassadors of China to France
Diplomats of the People's Republic of China
People's Republic of China politicians from Jiangsu
Chinese Communist Party politicians from Jiangsu
China–Monaco relations
Ambassadors of China to Senegal
Ambassadors of China to Monaco
Political office-holders in Hubei